Cimrmanium angulinotum is a species of beetle in the family Buprestidae, the only species in the genus Cimrmanium.

References

Monotypic Buprestidae genera
Beetles described in 2009